The Pivka Park of Military History is a military museum in the town in Pivka, Slovenia. It is operated jointly by the Municipality of Pivka and the Military Museum of the Slovene Armed Forces.

The museum's exhibits mainly date from the late WWII era and the Cold War, the timeframe of the former Socialist Federal Republic of Yugoslavia. The core collection consists of a large number of armored vehicles and artillery; there is also a small aviation collection, with five fixed-wing aircraft and two helicopters. The museum's most popular exhibit is the Zeta, an ex-Yugoslav Una-class infiltration submarine.

History

The complex was built by the Italian army as a frontier barracks during the interwar period, when much of what is presently southwestern Slovenia was part of the Kingdom of Italy. A fortress of the Alpine Wall, built to guard the Italian side of the pre-1941 Rapallo border, is an annex of the museum grounds and is accessible by hiking trail. After WWII, the Pivka barracks were successively inherited by the militaries of Yugoslavia and Slovenia. In 2004, the facility was transferred from the Slovene Ministry of Defense to the Municipality of Pivka, with the understanding that it would be converted into a military museum. The initial exhibit (the tank and artillery pavilion, with exhibits transferred from the Military Museum of the Slovene Armed Forces) opened in September 2006.

Exhibits

Gallery

See also
Military Museum, Belgrade

Notes

External links 
 

2006 establishments in Slovenia
History museums in Slovenia
Museums established in 2006
Military and war museums